The President's Cup National Football Tournament is a football competition, held by Korea Football Association, for South Korean semi-professional and amateur football clubs. This competition was originally one of major club competitions of South Korean football with Korean National Football Championship, but its status was undermined after the professional clubs appeared in South Korea according to the foundation of K League, the South Korean professional league. The tournament is usually held during the early months of the year, typically ending in March.

Champions

List of champions

Titles by club

See also
 List of Korean FA Cup winners
 Korean FA Cup
 Korean National Football Championship
 Korean Semi-professional Football League
 Korean Semi-professional Football Championship

References

External links 
President's Cup National Football Tournament at KFA

President's Cup
President's Cup